Phinally Phamous is the second studio album by rapper Lil Wyte. It debuted at #64 on Billboard 200 and #6 and featured Frayser Boy, Josey Scott, Three 6 Mafia, Hypnotize Camp Posse and Dirtbag. The album is Lil Wyte's only release that has been confirmed to be out of print as of 2012.

Track listing

References

2004 albums
Lil Wyte albums
Albums produced by DJ Paul
Albums produced by Juicy J